Peer Community in (PCI) is a non-profit scientific organization that offers an editorial process of open science by creating specific communities of researchers reviewing and recommending preprints in their field. Since 2021, a new journal, Peer Community Journal, publishes recommended preprints.

General principles 

PCI provides scientific validation of manuscripts, accessible in open archives in accordance with the principle of open access (free access for the author and for the reader), with the recommendations of the experts also being accessible to the reader and citable because they are signed and provided with a digital object identifier. As a whole, it is presented like a classic scientific journal, but one that provides more transparent and advanced services, in addition to being free.

PCI does not actually publish the scientific articles, so it is not affected by the Ingelfinger rule which regulates the duplication of publications. The same manuscript can therefore be recommended by PCIs from several disciplines, which is useful for promoting interdisciplinary work. The same manuscript can also be recommended by a PCI in the form of a preprint, then published by a classic journal.

Compatibility with traditional publishing 
Many scientific journals accept manuscripts previously distributed via preprints. A manuscript recommended by a PCI therefore remains free for later publication in most "classic" scientific journals.

Authors who have submitted their manuscript to a PCI and have benefited from an improvement-recommendation cycle generally then choose to submit it for publication in a classic journal. Some journals favor this choice, integrating PCI reviews into their own editorial process if they consider them adequate.

PCI communities 
There are different PCI communities for different sub-fields, each community with its own managing board, associate editors and external reviewers.

   Animal Science
   Archaeology
   Circuit Neuroscience
   Ecology
   Ecotoxicology and Environmental Chemistry
   Evolutionary Biology
   Forest & Wood Sciences
   Genomics
   Mathematical & Computational Biology
   Microbiology
   Network Sciences
   Paleontology
   Registered Reports
   Zoology

Organization 

Peer Community in was founded in 2016 as a non-profit organization under the French law. Founding members Denis Bourguet, Benoit Facon and Thomas Guillemaud are researchers at the Institut national de la recherche agronomique (INRAE). The organization is an «association loi de 1901» administratively based in Nice.

The Association coordinates the creation and activity of the various disciplinary PCI communities. Each community is funded by its own subsidies, which are very modest, as the editorial model does not provide any financial resources for e.g. author's publication costs, readers' consultation costs or subscriptions to their institutional libraries.

Each disciplinary PCI is made up of a management board comprising around ten recognized experts in the field, several tens or hundreds of associate editors (“recommenders”), and involves external reviewers.

Recognition 
A number of higher education institutions are accepting the students' preprints as equivalent to a publication in a peer-reviewed scientific journal, when those preprints are available at an open archive (such as arXiv, bioRxiv, etc.) and are recommended by a PCI.

The PCI initiative is supported by numerous institutions that value open science and bibliodiversity in their practices, such as the CNRS or the INEE. These institutions commit to:

Consider the PCI system as a legitimate means of evaluating and validating scientific results.
 Treat PCI recommended manuscripts in the same way as articles published in traditional scientific journals.
 Encourage their members, colleagues and students to integrate PCI into their editorial practices (reading, authoring, expertise).

More than 30 academic journals have claimed that they are happy to consider preprints recommended by PCI.

The three co-founders of PCI, along with Marjolaine Hamelin who later joined the team, were awarded the LIBER Award for Library Innovation in 2020 for the development of PCI, a free public system for peer-reviewing and highlighting preprints.

Media Coverage 
PCI was initially mostly discussed in the French media. It was discussed in Le Monde as an example of an open-science initiative in scientific publishing. PCI was also described in Sciences et Avenir as an alternative publishing platform that could be a more efficient use of resources for universities and researchers. As of mid-2020, PCI has attracted much more attention worldwide.

See also 
 Scientific journal
 Peer review
 Preprint
 Open science

References 

Scientific organizations established in 2016